Kambaata people (Amharic: ከምባታ) are a Cushitic ethnic group that inhabit the Southern Nations, Nationalities, and Peoples' Region of Ethiopia. They speak the Kambaata language, It was a province of Ethiopia beginning in the early 15th century through to the mid-17th century; Ethiopian rule was once again established in the late 19th century under Emperor Menelik II. During this first period, Kambaata province was largely Christianized. The former province is contained within the contemporary Kembata Tembaro Zone of SNNPR.

Demographics
According to Ethiopian statistics, the population of the Kambaata people was 
5, 627,565, of which 90.89% live in the Southern Nations, Nationalities, and People's Region. Almost one in five – 18.5% – live in urban areas.

The Kambaata people speak the Kambaata language, a Cushitic language.

History
The Kingdom of Kembata was ruled by long line of its own kings known as Woma. King Dagoye, from the Oyeta clan, was one of the famous kings known for expanding Kambaata territories. The last independent king of Kambaata was king (Woma) Delbato Degoye.

An important landmark for the Kambaata people is Mount Hambaricho, where their king, Woma, used to live and the people used to celebrate annual festivities in the past. The king and the god of Kambaata lived there.

Subsistence
They have many indigenous traditional foods, among which kocho, processed from ensete, is their staple diet. They also grow many kinds of tubers, spices, coffee, crops, and vegetables.

In Kembata province there are other clans like Tembaro, Alaba, and other different clans that live together and become Kambaata. The most isolated clan in Kembata province is Tanners Shekla Seriwoch, this clan could not participate in any socio-economic activities with Kambaata. Kambaata people could never marry from the Tanners clan.

Kambaata is one of the most densely populated regions in Ethiopia. Due to overpopulation and lack of economic opportunities in their region, they migrate to large cities, industrial areas, and large plantation farms. In recent years they experienced a large influx of migration to South Africa and Middle Eastern countries.

References

Further reading 
Arsano, Yacob, "A traditional Institution of Kambata" (2002). In: Bahru Zewde and Siegfried Pausewang(eds.), Ethiopia. The Challenge of Democracy from below.  Uppsala
Braukämper, Ulrich. 1983. Die Kambata: Geschichte und Gesellschaft eines süd-äthiopischen Bauernvolkes. Wiesbaden: Franz Steiner.
Gebrewold-Tochalo, Belachew (2002), The Impact of the Socio-Cultural Structures of the Kambata/Ethiopia on their Economic Development. Vienna.
Gebrewold, Belachew, "An introduction to the political and social philosophy of the Kambata" (Kambata Development Network website)
Daniel Yoseph Baiso, Occupational Minorities in Kambata Ethnic Group, Nairobi, 2007
 Ashenafi Yonas Abebe, "Resignificacion de algunos valores culturales del pueblo Kambata-Etiope esde el mensaje evangélico", Bogota, 2008.

Ethnic groups in Ethiopia
Cushitic-speaking peoples